Outi Petra Maria Kettunen-Walter (née Kettunen; born 8 March 1978) is a Finnish biathlete. She competed in the four events at the 2002 Winter Olympics.

In 2000, Kettunen received a two-year ban from competition due to testing positive for nandrolone. The ban was later cut to one year, ending in September 2001.

Kettunen-Walter works for a sports company in Switzerland.

References

External links
 

1978 births
Living people
Biathletes at the 2002 Winter Olympics
Finnish female biathletes
Olympic biathletes of Finland
Place of birth missing (living people)
Doping cases in biathlon
Finnish expatriate sportspeople in Switzerland
Finnish sportspeople in doping cases